Snooker at the 1984 Summer Paralympics consisted of two men's events. The competitions were held at Stoke Mandeville Stadium between 22 July and 1 August 1984.

There were six competitors:  five from Great Britain, and one from the Republic of Ireland.

Jimmy Gibson won the gold medal in the Men's paraplegic event, and P. Haslam won gold in the Men's tetraplegic competition.

Medal summary

References 

1984 Summer Paralympics events
1984
Paralympics